The Equatorial Guinea women's national football team has represented Equatorial Guinea at the FIFA Women's World Cup on one occasion, in 2011.

FIFA Women's World Cup record

*Draws include knockout matches decided on penalty kicks.

Record by opponent

2011 FIFA Women's World Cup

Group D

Goalscorers

References

 
World Cup
Countries at the FIFA Women's World Cup